The OpenReader Consortium is a nonprofit organization developing open digital publication standards. The project is in "cold storage" now, having been unable to successfully amass enough users for the formats it developed; they will continue their battle for open standards within the International Digital Publishing Forum (IDPF).

History

Cofounders 
Its co-founders were:

 Jon Noring, who, as of 2006, was the interim executive director, as well as a longtime e-book technologist, advocate, standards developer, and publisher. Previously, he held a PhD in mechanical engineering from the University of Minnesota and researched alternative energy conversion technologies at three Department of Energy National Laboratories.
 David Rothman, a former reporter interested in the digital divide and the educational divide, as well as a cofounder of LibraryEndowment.org and author of "The Silicon Jungle (Ballantine)", and who lives in Alexandria, Virginia.
 Rick Barry, an international management consultant and principal of Barry Associates, and a former World Bank chief of office systems and information services. (In 1960, he began working in information technology with a digital global reporting system for the United States Department of Defense.)
 Michael Day, a software developer specializing in creating tools for XML publishing, editing, and browsing.
 Lee Passey, who serves as "Lead Orca Developer and Technical Advisor".

Successes and failures 

The consortium considers its chief success to be successfully getting the IDPF to take open digital publication standards seriously, which eventually led to the development of the EPUB format.

The consortium considers its chief failure to be its lack of developer and publisher support (despite its support by OSoft), which prevented it from being able to successfully deploy an open standard in the marketplace.

With IDPF 
From 2009, their campaign for open publication standards was to happen within IDPF; their recommendations include branding the EPUB standard and emphasizing its non-DRM side. On 30 January 2017, IDPF and the World Wide Web Consortium officially merged with each other.

Formats and specifications developed

Formats 
The consortium was able to indirectly develop the EPUB format, which was introduced in 2007 by the IDPF as the successor to the Open eBook format. EPUB documents can be marked up in XHTML or DTBook. EPUB documents conform to three IDPF standards: Open Publication Structure (OPS), which defines the markup language; Open Container Format (OCF), a zipped archive with extension .EPUB that contains the marked-up document; and an Open Packaging Format (OPF) file that references everything in the OCF, provides metadata, and ties the file together.

The consortium also developed the OpenReader format, an XML-based text format with components from the Open eBook format for ebooks, articles, documents, news, and publications with graphics and which supports digital rights management. (The Open eBook format is an XML-based ebook and web publishing standard introduced by the IDPF in 1999 as the "Open eBook Publication Structure Specification" and last updated in 2002. Open eBook publications are not read directly by ebook devices, but are rather first compiled into a proprietary format.) Readers for the OpenReader format include Thout Reader, launched by Osoft in 2006 in beta and later renamed dotReader, although this was not enough for this to gain critical mass. The Thout Reader software allowed readers to distribute notes to each other via Osoft servers.

Specifications 
The OpenReader Consortium has developed the following specifications:

 Binder Document Specification
 Basic Content Document Specification
 OpenReader Format Binder Specification

As of 2006, the OpenReader Consortium has also been developing the following specifications:

 Extended Content Document Specification
 Publication Framework Specification
 OpenReader Container Format Specification
 "orp:" IRI Scheme Specification
 Character Entity References Common Set Specification

References

External links
OpenReader Consortium - Original Homepage (Suspended in August 2007); 
 Current Homepage
 International Digital Publishing Forum

Electronic publishing
International non-profit organizations